The 2003 W-League Season was the 9th season of the USL W-League, the second-highest division of women's soccer in the United States. The Boston Renegades were the defending champions. The Hampton Roads Piranhas were crowned champions after defeating the Chicago Cobras in the Championship game.

Changes from the 2002 season

Format changes
The league went to the standard FIFA match points format: 3 points for a win (down from the previous 4), 1 for a draw, 0 for a loss, and eliminated bonus points for 3 or more goals scored.

Name changes
One team changed their name in the off-season:

Expansion teams
One team joined the league ahead of the start of the season:

Teams leaving
Two teams left to join the WPSL:
 Maryland Pride
 Rhode Island Rays

Eight teams folded after the 2002 season:
 Albuquerque Crush
 Jacksonville Jade
 Kansas City Mystics
 Kentucky Fillies
 Memphis Mercury
 Oklahoma Outrage
 Tampa Bay Xtreme
 Texas Odyssey

Standings
Blue indicates division title clinched
Green indicates playoff berth clinched

Central Conference

Atlantic Division

Midwest Division

Eastern Conference

Northeast Division

Northern Division

Western Conference

Playoffs

Format
Four teams from both the Central and Eastern Conferences and two from the Western Conference qualified for the playoffs. All playoff matchups were in single-leg elimination tournament format with the higher seeded team hosting until the national semifinals. Seeding was determined by league record, with the Boston Renegades seeded first with 39 points. The host of the national semifinals was determined by bids at the 2002 USL Annual General Meeting.

In the Central and Eastern Conferences, the top two teams from each division played, and then divisional winners played for the conference championship and to advance to the national semifinals.

The top two teams in the Western Conference, having only one division, played each other to advance to the semifinals.

As hosts, the Hampton Roads Piranhas received a bye into the W-League national semifinals, with the third-place team from the Atlantic Division receiving a playoff berth. The W-League Championship final was televised live on Fox Sports World.

Conference Brackets
Central Conference

Eastern Conference

Western Conference

W-League Championship Bracket

Divisional Championships

Conference championships

W-League Semifinals

W-League Third Place

W-League Championship

Season statistics

 Scoring Champion: Jeanette Akerlund (Ottawa Fury Women) and Kelly Parker (Ottawa Fury Women) (32 points)
 Goal Scoring Champion: Jeanette Akerlund (Ottawa Fury Women) and Carrie Kveton (Boston Renegades) (14 goals)
 Assist Leader: Rhian Wilkinson (Ottawa Fury Women) (7 assists)

Top scorers

Top assists

|}

Awards

 Most Valuable Player: Phebe Trotman (Vancouver Whitecaps Women)
 Rookie of the Year: Stacey Stocco (Boston Renegades)
 Defender of the Year: Fanta Cooper (Chicago Cobras)
 Coach of the Year: Mike Nesci (Chicago Cobras)
 Goalkeeper of the Year: Meredith Flaherty (Hampton Roads Piranhas)
 Championship MVP: Mercy Akide (Hampton Roads Piranhas)

The W-League Championship All-Tournament Team was announced on August 10, 2003:

F: Tina Frimpong (Seattle Sounders Women), Kristen Graczyk (Chicago Cobras), Mercy Akide (Hampton Roads Piranhas)
M: Melissa Bennett (Seattle Sounders Women), Florence Omagbemi (Hampton Roads Piranhas), Darci Borski (Hampton Roads Piranhas), Kelly Parker (Ottawa Fury Women)
D: Jenna Szyluk (Hampton Roads Piranhas), Fanta Cooper (Chicago Cobras), Josha Krueger (Chicago Cobras)
G: Meredith Flaherty (Hampton Roads Piranhas)

All-League and All-Conference Teams

The All-Conference Teams were announced on August 1, 2003. The All-League Team was announced on August 4.

Central Conference 
G: Meredith Flaherty (Hampton Roads Piranhas) *
D: Fanta Cooper (Chicago Cobras) *, Deanna Kriedel (Charlotte Lady Eagles), Erin Showalter (Cincinnati Ladyhawks)
M: Florence Omagbemi (Hampton Roads Piranhas), Elizabeth Ramsey (Chicago Cobras), Julianne Sitch (Chicago Cobras) *, Sarah Wall (Columbus Lady Shooting Stars)
F: Mercy Akide (Hampton Roads Piranhas) *, Andrea Cunningham (Cincinnati Ladyhawks), Annette Kent	(Windy City Bluez)

Eastern Conference 
G: Meghan Frey (Boston Renegades)
D: Linda Consolante (Ottawa Fury Women), Francesca DeCristoforo (Long Island Lady Riders) *, Caitlin Fisher (Boston Renegades)
M: Sue Flamini (New Jersey Stallions), Kelly Parker (Ottawa Fury Women) *, Melissa Shulman (Long Island Lady Riders), Stacey Stocco (Boston Renegades) *
F: Jeanette Akerlund (Ottawa Fury Women), Carrie Kveton (Boston Renegades), Jessica Reifer (New York Magic) *

Western Conference 
G: Megan Miller (Seattle Sounders Women)
D: Sasha Andrews (Vancouver Whitecaps Women) *, Shannon Forslund (Seattle Sounders Women), Amy Gray Denver Lady Cougars
M: Kacy Beitel (Denver Lady Cougars), Tara Kidwell (Fort Collins Force), Andrea Neil (Vancouver Whitecaps Women), Tracey Spinelli (Arizona Heatwave) *
F: Janelle Munnis (Seattle Sounders Women), Carolyn Theurer (Denver Lady Cougars), Phebe Trotman (Vancouver Whitecaps Women) *

* denotes All-League player

See also
 2003 PDL Season

References

2003
Women
1
W